Junelyn Alexis "Asia" Unana Agcaoili (born September 20, 1977) is a Filipina actress, model, entrepreneur, television and radio host, and former columnist.

Entertainment career
Agcaoili was already a model when she joined the ABC reality show SINGLE in 2002. In four episodes, she bested the two other contestants to become the "Single Girl". The show subsequently featured her for 13 episodes.

In 2003, she joined the second batch of the Viva Hot Babes, a girl group known for double entendre lyrics, sensual performances, as well as appearances in men's magazines and films. The group released three albums before disbanding in 2008. With her fellow Hot Babes, Agcaoili appeared in the film First Time (2003) and then starred in the sexually-informative direct-to-video films Sex Guru (2004) and Erotica: Lessons of the Flesh (2005).

In March 2004, Agcaoili was suspended for 20 days by ABS-CBN after her left breast was exposed during a Viva Hot Babes dance performance for the live variety show MTB. She explained that the incident was unintentional. In July that year, she appeared on the cover of FHM Philippines and became the magazine's sex columnist, writing monthly until 2009. She also appeared several times on the magazine's 100 Sexiest Women list, with her highest rank being 13th place in 2005 and 2006.

She then joined an episode on the GMA Network reality game show Extra Challenge, where she displayed her intelligence and confidence while faced with conservative moralists.

In radio, she was a disc jockey on the radio station Magic 89.9 until January 14, 2007. Agcaoíli is known for being very open in talking about sex.

She was also a regular on the ABS-CBN show Bida si Mister, Bida si Misis.

Agcaoíli had the role of a villain in Till Death Do Us Part on ABS-CBN.

Her first television appearance in New Zealand was in a 2020 COVID-19 public service announcement.

Personal life
Agcaoili graduated from the University of the Philippines Diliman with a bachelor's degree in clothing technology.

She moved to Amsterdam, Netherlands in 2007 to join her boyfriend, Dutch computer programmer Bram van der Kolk. She gave birth to their son, Xander, in April 2009. The couple then married on September 9 that year. During her time in the Netherlands, she took Dutch integration courses at the University of Amsterdam. She also met with the self-exiled communist leader Jose Maria Sison.

Agcaoili, along with her husband and son, later moved to Auckland, New Zealand. There, Van der Kolk worked as the chief programmer of Megaupload. He, along with his colleagues, were charged with copyright infringement, racketeering, and money laundering when the company was shut down in 2012. When the company was re-launched as Mega in 2013, Van der Kolk was retained as chief programmer while Agcaoili became a shareholder.

She is bisexual.

Later shows
Agcaoili spearheaded the Pinoy Big Brother show for the viewers of Studio 23. Her show, called Pinoy Big Brother: Si Kuya, KaBarkada Mo, featured snippets from the primetime telecast the night before, but also featured opinion polls both from the man on the street and those sending SMS, spoof segments (such as predictions from "prominent" fortune tellers and insider news from the "resident" deep penetration agent, a cockroach), and live feeds from inside the house.

She was also one of the hosts of Breakfast on Studio 23 every Thursday and was part of the teleserye Vietnam Rose on ABS-CBN, where she teamed up with her Bida si Mister, Bida si Misis and the Philippines' Diamond Star, Maricel Soriano.

She also hosted the Sunday afternoon TV show iPBA on ABC, a show that featured the ins and outs of the PBA which included interviews with league personalities.

References

External links

 
Asia Agcaoili's Sex Confidential on FHM.com.ph
Asia Agcaoili on FHM.com.ph
Asia Agcaoíli on GoPilipinas.com

1977 births
Living people
Filipino radio personalities
Filipino female models
Filipino LGBT actors
21st-century Filipino actresses
Bisexual women
Filipino bisexual people
University of the Philippines Diliman alumni
21st-century Filipino LGBT people